Oliver Henkel may refer to:

, German science fiction writer
 Oliver Henkel, German musician and former member of musical group Chandeen